Pont de Pierre may refer to the following bridges:

 Pont de Pierre (Aosta), a Roman bridge in Aosta, Italy
 Pont de Pierre (Bordeaux), a 19th-century bridge in Bordeaux, France

See also
 Stone Bridge (disambiguation)